In mathematical graph theory, the rooted product of a graph G and a rooted graph H is defined as follows: take |V(G)| copies of H, and for every vertex  of G, identify  with the root node of the i-th copy of H.

where

and

If G is also rooted at g1, one can view the product itself as rooted, at (g1, h1). The rooted product is a subgraph of the cartesian product of the same two graphs.

Applications
The rooted product is especially relevant for trees, as the rooted product of two trees is another tree. For instance, Koh et al. (1980) used rooted products to find graceful numberings for a wide family of trees.

If H is a two-vertex complete graph K2, then for any graph G, the rooted product of G and H has domination number exactly half of its number of vertices. Every connected graph in which the domination number is half the number of vertices arises in this way, with the exception of the four-vertex cycle graph. These graphs can be used to generate examples in which the bound of Vizing's conjecture, an unproven inequality between the domination number of the graphs in a different graph product, the cartesian product of graphs, is exactly met . They are also well-covered graphs.

References
.
.
.

Graph products